Heimo Reinitzer (born 24 September 1943) is an Austrian athlete. He competed in the men's discus throw at the 1968 Summer Olympics and the 1972 Summer Olympics.

References

1943 births
Living people
Athletes (track and field) at the 1968 Summer Olympics
Athletes (track and field) at the 1972 Summer Olympics
Austrian male discus throwers
Olympic athletes of Austria
Place of birth missing (living people)